Wishart is a hamlet in Emerald Rural Municipality No. 277 in the Canadian province of Saskatchewan. It is listed as a designated place by Statistics Canada. The hamlet had a population of 95 in the Canada 2006 Census. It previously held the status of village until January 1, 2002. The hamlet is located 32 km southwest of the village of Elfros at the intersection of highway 639 and highway 743.

History
Prior to January 1, 2002, Wishart was incorporated as a village, and was restructured as a hamlet under the jurisdiction of the Rural municipality of Emerald on that date.

Demographics 

See also

List of communities in Saskatchewan
Hamlets of Saskatchewan

References

Designated places in Saskatchewan
Emerald No. 277, Saskatchewan
Former villages in Saskatchewan
Organized hamlets in Saskatchewan
Populated places disestablished in 2002
Division No. 10, Saskatchewan